Cartoona Peak is a volcanic peak in northern British Columbia, Canada, located just southeast of Coffee Crater in Mount Edziza Provincial Park.

See also
List of volcanoes in Canada
List of Northern Cordilleran volcanoes
Mount Edziza volcanic complex
Volcanism of Canada
Volcanism of Western Canada

References

Mount Edziza volcanic complex
Two-thousanders of British Columbia
Lava domes
Miocene volcanoes
Cassiar Land District